The 2008 Speedway Grand Prix of Poland was the ninth race of the 2008 Speedway Grand Prix season. It took place on September 13 in the Polonia Stadium in Bydgoszcz, Poland. The Grand Prix was won by Greg Hancock from United States, it was his first GP win of the 2008 season.

Riders 

The Speedway Grand Prix Commission nominated Wiesław Jaguś as a wild card, and Krzysztof Buczkowski and Adrian Gomólski both as track reserves. The draw was made on September 2 at the FIM Headquarters in Mies, Switzerland. Maciej Janowski replaced Adrian Gomólski, having been injured in the Polish First League match on 2008-09-07 (KM Ostrów vs Polonia Bydgoszcz 42:47).

 Draw No 18:  (18) Adrian Gomólski →  (18) Maciej Janowski

Andreas Jonsson and Krzysztof Buczkowski were Polonia Bydgoszcz's riders in 2008 season.

Heat details

Heat after heat 

 Nicholls, Jaguś, Andersen, Iversen
 Crump, Harris, Buczkowski, Dryml, Lindgren (T/-)
 N.Pedersen, Hancock, Adams, Kasprzak
 Gollob, Jonsson, B.Pedersen, Holta
 Gollob, Andersen, Crump, Kasprzak (E4)
 N.Pedersen, Harris, Jonsson, Jaguś
 Adams, Iversen, B.Pedersen, Lindgren
 Nicholls, Hancock, Holta, Dryml
 Andersen, Adams, Harris, Holta
 Jaguś, Crump, Hancock, B.Pedersen
 Jonsson, Dryml, Kasprzak, Iversen
 Gollob, N.Pedersen, Nicholls, Lindgren
 Hancock, Andersen, Jonsson, Lindgren (E3)
 Gollob, Jaguś, Adams, Dryml
 N.Pedersen, Holta, Iversen, Crump
 Kasprzak, B.Pedersen, Nicholls, Harris
 N.Pedersen, Andersen, Dryml, B.Pedersen
 Holta, Kasprzak, Jaguś, Lindgren
 Gollob, Hancock, Iversen, Harris
 Crump, Adams, Jonsson, Nicholls
 Semi-Finals:
 Gollob, Nicholls, Andersen, Adams
 N.Pedersen, Hancock, Jaguś, Crump
 Final:
 Hancock (6 points), N.Pedersen (4), Gollob (2), Nicholls (0)

The intermediate classification

See also 
 Speedway Grand Prix
 List of Speedway Grand Prix riders

References

External links 
 www.SpeedwayWorld.tv

Poland
Speedway Grand Prix of Poland
2008 A